Museum Mystery (also known as Museum Peace) is a 1937 British crime film directed by Clifford Gulliver and starring Jock McKay, Elizabeth Inglis and Gerald Case. The screenplay concerns a gang of criminals who plan to steal a Burmese idol.

Plot summary
A gang of criminals plan to steal a valuable Burmese idol from a British museum but are foiled by the curator.

Cast
 Jock McKay - Jock 
 Elizabeth Inglis - Ruth Carter 
 Gerald Case - Peter Redding 
 Tony Wylde - Mr. Varleigh 
 Charles Paton - Clutters 
 Alfred Wellesley - Mayor 
 Sebastian Smith - Dr. Trapnell 
 Roy Byford - Professor Wickstead

References

External links

1937 films
1937 crime films
Films produced by Anthony Havelock-Allan
British black-and-white films
British and Dominions Studios films
British crime films
1930s English-language films
1930s British films